Analomink is a former Delaware, Lackawanna and Western Railroad station  along PA Route 191 in Analomink, Stroud Township, Monroe County, Pennsylvania. PennDOT and Stroud Township own the two parcels that comprise the proposed site, which would be serviced by New Jersey Transit. While the Township-owned portion is currently vacant, the parcel under PennDOT ownership is used for roadway maintenance materials storage.

History
This station and the next station, Henryville, were the two stations northwest from the East Stroudsburg station to the Cresco station. By the late 1930s Analomink served just a few local trains DLW a day, with the noteworthy named trains bypassing the station. The station stopped seeing passenger service at some point between 1939 and 1946.

Prospective return of service
The station site will be situated between the track and Route 191, and would include a 250-space surface parking lot. Access to this site will be from Routes 191 and 447.

Rail service to New Jersey and New York City would be provided by NJ Transit via the Lackawanna Cut-Off.

References

External links
 Lackawanna Cut-Off map

Proposed NJ Transit rail stations
Railway stations in Monroe County, Pennsylvania